Margaret Fay Shaw (9 November 1903 – 11 December 2004) was a pioneering Scottish-American ethnomusicologist, photographer, and folklorist. She is best known for her work among Scottish Gaelic-speakers in the Hebrides and among Canadian Gaelic-speaking communities in Nova Scotia.

Early life 
The youngest of five sisters, Shaw was born in her family's "substantial mansion", in Glenshaw, Pennsylvania, where the Shaw family had lived since one of the four sons of her great-great grandfather, Scottish immigrant John Shaw, had settled there in 1782 and given his name to the surrounding district. The Shaw family's subsequent wealth was drawn from canny investments in Pittsburgh steel refineries.

In addition to raising her as a Presbyterian, Margaret's parents were reportedly very loving and attentive and she developed a passionate interest in music from an early age when she learned to play the piano. After her parents died when she was 11, she moved to Scotland as a teenager and attended St Bride's boarding school in Helensburgh, near Glasgow. It was there that she was first introduced to Scottish traditional music and started learning to speak Gaelic. The first performance of Gaelic song she heard was during a special concert at St. Bride's by the famous song collector Marjory Kennedy-Fraser, "who", according to Robert Perman, "had made a career of collecting Gaelic songs in the Hebrides and singing her own Anglicized versions of them. The songs entranced Margaret, but at the same time she was aware that there must be more to them and determined that one day she would hear the originals."

Musicologist
While studying at New York University, she returned to Scotland in the 1920s and was overjoyed to once again the songs she had heard at St. Bride's, but sung in the original Gaelic by native speakers of the language.

After her plans to be a concert pianist were thwarted by rheumatism, Shaw switched, to the horror of her family, to the new field of ethnomusicology with the encouragement of Nadia Boulanger and Eileen Costello and turned to full time folk song collecting. She realized over time, however, that the study of Classical music had not prepared her for collecting from traditional singers in Celtic languages, whose repertoire uses a completely different system of scales, tonalities, and modes.

She eventually came to South Uist, of which she later recalled, "Of all the islands I'd visited there was something about South Uist that just won me; it was like falling in love; it was the island that I wanted to go back to. Of course, I was not looking for islands: I was looking for a way to live my life."

While staying in Lochboisdale, she was entertained by the singing of two sisters, Mairi and Peigi MacRae. They told her that if she came to visit the former blackhouse at their remote croft, they would teach her all the songs they knew. Enthralled by their singing, she ended up living with them for the next six years and became a close friend. During this time, she recorded a great deal of information about the songs and stories they knew. Much of this information was published in her book Folksongs and Folklore of South Uist. Two-thirds of the contributors to the book were women. One of the most prominent figures featured in the book's songs and stories is St Bride, about whom many local customs were recorded. The book also preserves many waulking songs.

Shaw's photographs highlighted the working lives of women in South Uist, who played crucial roles in their families and local economies.

Personal life
Shaw's photographic work attracted the attention of John Lorne Campbell. He came to South Uist to seek her help in the production of the book about Barra he was working on with Compton Mackenzie. 

On an extremely wet and rainy evening in 1934, Campbell was introduced in typically Scottish style as "Young Inverneill" to Margaret Fay Shaw by the manager of the Lochboisdale Hotel on South Uist. Campbell later recalled, "As so often happens, we didn't take to each other at first, but we got to know each other and we were working in the same little world."

Their courtship was slow and awkward, but in March 1935, Margaret Fay Shaw brought Campbell to meet her family in Glenshaw, Pennsylvania. She later recalled that he spent the whole visit chasing butterflies in the nearby forest or typing up books and articles in his room. The whole Shaw family accordingly decided that Campbell must not be seriously interested in Margaret and no one was more shocked than she was when Campbell proposed marriage on the last day of his visit.

In June 1935, John Lorne Campbell and Margaret Fay Shaw were married by Rev. Calum MacLeod in the manse of John Knox Presbyterian Church in Glasgow. Neither family attended and the bride was given away by family friend Fred Moir. At the groom's insistence, the entire ceremony was conducted in the Scottish Gaelic language and the bride was relieved to learn that she had only to say, "Tha" ("Yes"). The Campbells spent their brief honeymoon in the Lofoten and Vesteraalen Islands of Norway before returning to Scotland.

Later life
In 1937, the Campbells travelled to Nova Scotia with an Ediphone to record Canadian Gaelic folklore and traditional singers. The Campbells spent six weeks in Cape Breton before moving on to Antigonish County, where they used the Ediphone to record upon wax cylinders ninety five Gaelic traditional songs and ballads, two games, seven local songs, and three original songs sung by their composer. The Campbells also persuaded  (1869–1944), the former editor of the literary magazine Mac-Talla, to introduce him to Gabriel Syllibuy, the Chief of Cape Breton's indigenous Mi'kmaq people. The Campbells recorded Syllibuy as he described, in the Mikmaq language, an account from the oral tradition about the arrival of the first Gaels in the Province. The Campbells also recorded other Mikmaqs singing Roman Catholic plain song hymns in the Mik'maq language.

The Canadian Gaelic song recordings made in Nova Scotia by the Campbells were later transcribed into musical notation with the assistance of Irish traditional musician and collector Séamus Ennis and published in the volume, Songs Remembered in Exile: Traditional Gaelic Songs from Nova Scotia Recorded in Cape Breton and Antigonish County in 1937, with an Account of the Causes of the Highland Emigration, 1790–1835. 

They lived in Barra until Campbell purchased the island of Canna in 1938. 

Margaret followed her husband into the Catholic Church in Scotland a few years after his conversion in 1946. Shaw always insisted that her favorite English-language Presbyterian hymns from her childhood, such as Charles Wesley's Christ the Lord is Risen Today, be sung during Low Mass at St Columba's R.C. Church upon Canna, much to the incomprehension of the island's Gaelic-speaking population.

They donated their house to the National Trust for Scotland in 1981, though she continued to live there even after her husband's death in 1996. For her contributions to the study and preservation of Gaelic music and culture, she was awarded honorary degrees by the Universities of Edinburgh, Aberdeen, St Francis Xavier, and the National University of Ireland.

Shaw died in Fort William in 2004 at the age of 101.

Legacy
In 2007, scholars gathered in a conference in her honour in South Uist called "Gleann na Ceolraidh", meaning "Glen of the Muses" in Gaelic. As part of this event, a CD featuring recordings of folk songs Shaw collected was released. It was recorded by two of her close friends, Paul McCallum and Vivien Mackie. In 2019, Shaw was commemorated in the film Solas, which made use of previously unseen footage Shaw shot in the Hebrides. Today, Canna House, which houses the collections she and her husband made during their lifetimes, remains one of the most important archives of Gaelic culture and language in the world. Many of the early sound recordings she made are available online on the platform Tobar an Dualchais.

In November 2022 Shaw's work featured in the GLEAN exhibition at Edinburgh's City Art Centre of 14 early women photographers working in Scotland. The photographs and films that were curated by Jenny Brownrigg were by Shaw, Helen Biggar, Violet Banks, Christina Broom, M.E.M. Donaldson, Dr Beatrice Garvie, Jenny Gilbertson, Isabel Frances Grant, Ruby Grierson, Marion Grierson, Isobel Wylie Hutchison, Johanna Kissling, Isabell Burton-MacKenzie and Margaret Watkins

Bibliography 

 Folksongs and Folklore of South Uist (1955)
 From the Alleghenies to the Hebrides: An Autobiography (1993)
 Eilean: The Photography of Margaret Fay Shaw (2018)

See also 

 John Lorne Campbell
 Marjory Kennedy-Fraser

References

External links 

 Canna House at the National Trust for Scotland
 Recordings by Margaret Fay Shaw on Tobar and Dualchais

1903 births
2004 deaths
20th-century American musicologists
American centenarians
American emigrants to Scotland
American ethnomusicologists
Canadian Gaelic
Celtic studies scholars
Collectors of fairy tales
Converts to Roman Catholicism from Presbyterianism
Folklorists of Canadian folklore
Mi'kmaq
People associated with Scottish islands
Scottish centenarians
Scottish folklorists
Scottish Gaelic language
Scottish Gaelic literature
Scottish folk-song collectors
Scottish folk music
Scottish women photographers